Avala Film is a Serbian film studio, founded in 1946 as the first studio founded in post-war Yugoslavia. It is currently declared bankrupt.

Overview
In June 1946, the government of the Socialist Federal Republic of Yugoslavia created the State Committee of Cinematography, in order to replace the provisional Film Enterprise of the SFRY. The Committee set out to establish film production companies in the various constituent states of Yugoslavia: the first and the largest of those was Avala Film, in the Socialist Republic of Serbia's capital Belgrade, which was founded on 15 July. The company was located in the future complex of Filmski Grad, which the Committee had only begun planning.

In 1947, Avala Film produced the first feature film made in postwar Yugoslavia, Vjekoslav Afrić's Slavica. Until 2000, the studio participated in the creation of 400 documentaries, 200 feature films and 120 co-productions with foreign companies; its pictures won more than 200 awards in various festivals.

After the Breakup of Yugoslavia, the studio was partially privatized and 51% of its shares were sold to a company called Jugoexport, while the rest were retained by Avala Film's management. Since the mid-1990, it has produced few films, and its last one - Shadows of Memories - was released in 2000. The studio is facing financial troubles, and was threatened with liquidation after Jugoexport was declared bankrupt. Since 2005, plans to fully privatize it were proposed, but not carried out. In June 2011, the studio was announced to be bankrupt, after accumulating a debt of 111,000,000 Serbian dinar. In early 2012, the Serbian government announced plans to revitalize Avala Film. but assistance never materialized.  The company's real estate, film rights, costumes, props and studios were scheduled to be sold-off in spring 2013.

Selected filmography
1953 - Perfidy
1957 - Priests Ćira and Spira
1961 - Siberian Lady Macbeth
1964 - March on the Drina (Mars na Drinu)
1965 - Three
1966 - The Dream
1967 - I Even Met Happy Gypsies
1968 - It Rains in My Village
1970 - Liberation
1987 - Reflections
1989 - The Meeting Point

Selected international co-productions
1954 - The Last Bridge
1962 - Taras Bulba
1963 - The Long Ships
1964 - Marco the Magnificent (La Fabuleuse aventure de Marco Polo)
1965 - Genghis Khan
1967 - The 25th Hour
1968 - Kelly's Heroes
1969 - Castle Keep
1972 - England Made Me
1984 - Quo Vadis? (miniseries)
1986 - Escape from Sobibor (TV movie)
1987 - The Fortunate Pilgrim (miniseries)
1987 - Crusoe
1988 - Around the World in 80 Days (miniseries)
1989 - Boris Godunov

References

External links
Website
Avala Film on the IMDb.
A short history of the studio.

Cinema of Yugoslavia
Serbian film studios
Film production companies of Serbia
1946 establishments in Serbia
Mass media companies established in 1946
Čukarica